Grace in Gravity (1991) is the debut album from the folk-rock duo The Story. The album was first released by Green Linnet Records and in 1992 it was re-released by Elektra Records with the same track listing.

Track listing

The Story is
Jonatha Brooke - Vocals, Acoustic Guitar, Piano
Jennifer Kimball - Vocals

Musicians
Duke Levine - Guitars
Mike Rivard - Bass
Alain Mallet - Keyboards
Ben Wittman - Drummer

Production
Ben Wittman - Producer
Bill Verdier - Executive Producer
Coleman Rogers - Recording Engineer
Mixed by Ben Whittman, Alain Mallet and Coleman Rogers
Recorded at Bay Farm Studios, Kingston, MA except track 11 at Blue Jay Studio, Carlisle, MA (Engineer: Mark Tanzer)
Mastered by Suha Gur at Digital SoundWorks, New York City

Track information and credits verified from the album's liner notes.

References

1991 debut albums
The Story (American band) albums